The Kitchen, Montross & Wilcox Store at 85 Leonard Street between Broadway and Church Street in the TriBeCa neighborhood of Manhattan, New York City was built in 1861 in the Italianate style for a company which dealt in dry goods. The cast iron for the building's facade came from James Bogardus's ironworks, one of the few surviving buildings for which that is the case. The building's columns are referred to as "sperm-candle style" from their resemblance to candles made from spermaceti.

The design [of the building] combines classically-inspired elements with the non-classical emphasis on lightness,
openness, and verticality which characterizes cast-iron architecture.

The building was designated a New York City landmark in 1974, and was added to the National Register of Historic Places in 1980. It is located within the Tribeca East Historic District.

References
Notes

External links

List of New York City Designated Landmarks in Manhattan below 14th Street

Cast-iron architecture in New York City
Buildings and structures on the National Register of Historic Places in Manhattan
New York City Designated Landmarks in Manhattan
James Bogardus buildings
Italianate architecture in New York City
Commercial buildings completed in 1861
1861 establishments in New York (state)
Tribeca